State Road 311 (SR 311) in the U.S. state of Indiana was a short southwest-to-northeast route in the southeastern part of the state.

Route description
State Road 311 ran a five-mile (8 km) stretch from Interstate 265 north of New Albany to U.S. Route 31 near Interstate 65 in Sellersburg.  State Road 311 in Floyd County ran along what is known as Charlestown Road.

History 
A two-mile (3 km) stretch south of Interstate 265 was decommissioned by the state and maintenance was turned over to the city of New Albany. In October 2012, the portion of SR 311 in Clark County was given to the county. The remainder of the route was given back to Floyd County on January 28, 2013.

U.S. Route 31W 
SR 311 was signed as US 31W until 1980.  When US 31W was removed from the area, INDOT renumbered the route as SR 311. The bridge that carried US 31W over the Ohio River, the Kentucky & Indiana Terminal Bridge, has not carried vehicle traffic since Interstate 64 was built in downtown New Albany.

Major intersections

References

External links

311
Transportation in Clark County, Indiana
Transportation in Floyd County, Indiana
U.S. Route 31
New Albany, Indiana